Blood Communion: A Tale of Prince Lestat is a horror novel by American writer  Anne Rice, the 13th and last book in The Vampire Chronicles series, published on October 2, 2018. It is the most recent of The Vampire Chronicles to be narrated by the vampire Lestat de Lioncourt, and it is the first of The Vampire Chronicles to contain illustrations (by Mark Edward Geyer). It is the final novel in the series after Rice's passing on December 11, 2021.

Plot summary 
The novel is a tale told by the vampire Lestat de Lioncourt, in which he recounts his confrontations with the villainous vampire Rhoshamandes; his efforts to successfully rule the vampiric world as Prince Lestat; and his attempts to bring together the vampires of the world into one unified, familial tribe, in order to end centuries of enmity and isolation between the various vampiric factions and individuals. Over the course of the novel, Lestat is forced to grapple with questions of vampiric mortality; the limitations of his own ability to save and protect the ones he loves; as well as his overall purpose and goals as both an individual blooddrinker and as Prince of the vampires.

References

External links
  
 "We've Got a Sneak Peek at Anne Rice's New Vampire Lestat Tale, Blood Communion" – io9
 
 
 

2018 American novels
2018 fantasy novels
2010s horror novels
American fantasy novels
Novels by Anne Rice
The Vampire Chronicles novels
Alfred A. Knopf books